Tetratheca neglecta is a species of plant in the quandong family that is endemic to Australia.

Description
The species grows as a compact or diffuse shrub to 15–60 cm in height. The solitary, deep lilac-pink flowers have petals 5–10 mm long, appearing from August to November.

Distribution and habitat
The plants grow in sandy heath and dry sclerophyll forest in the Sydney district of eastern New South Wales, as far south as Robertson.

References

neglecta
Flora of New South Wales
Oxalidales of Australia
Taxa named by Joy Thompson
Plants described in 1976